Allan Sirois (born February 19, 1975) is a former ice hockey player. A career minor leaguer, he is the ECHL's ninth all-time career scorer with 594 points.

Playing career 
Sirois started his hockey career with stints with the Chicoutimi Saguenéens and the Rimouski Océanic, both teams of the Quebec Major Junior Hockey League, or QMJHL. In his one season with the Oceanic, he tallied a points total of 127. He then graduated to the Worcester IceCats of the American Hockey League (AHL). Sirois had only one point in two and a half seasons of work for the IceCats and moved to the ECHL with teams such as the Baton Rouge Kingfish and the Jacksonville Lizard Kings. He then moved to a more permanent job in the league with the Pee Dee Pride of Florence, South Carolina (his one-year stint with the Florence Pride is not a change of teams, but a name change by the franchise). He produced fifty points in all but one season, and surpassed the 500 point mark for his career before the Pride ceased operations in April 2005. He remained in South Carolina the following season to play for the Greenville Grrrowl. He produced 48 points for the Grrrowl in 2006. He later spent time with the Pee Dee Cyclones, Texas Wildcatters and Twin City Cyclones, last playing in 2008–09.

Career statistics

References

External links

1975 births
Living people
Baton Rouge Kingfish players
Canadian ice hockey left wingers
Chicoutimi Saguenéens (QMJHL) players
Florence Pride players
Greenville Grrrowl players
Ice hockey people from Quebec
Jacksonville Lizard Kings players
Pee Dee Cyclones players
Pee Dee Pride players
People from Rivière-du-Loup
Rimouski Océanic players
Texas Wildcatters players
Twin City Cyclones players
Worcester IceCats players